is The National Cultural Festival held in Okayama Prefecture, Japan between October 30 and November 7, 2010. The festival hosted 68 events such as the opening festival, orchestral music, choral music, brass band music, drama, literary, arts, dance, traditional Japanese music are held throughout the festival in all of Okayama Prefecture's cities, towns and villages.

The Opening Ceremony was performed by the lead cast Shin Koyamada as Makibi on the stage in Momotaro Arena in Okayama. Special guests included the Japanese Crown Prince and the Governor of Okayama Prefecture.

The press conference and official announcement were attended by Masahiro Ishii, Shin Koyamada, Noritake Kanzaki and Chika Kano in Okayama on 17 February 2010.

Hosted by 
 Agency for Cultural Affairs
 Okayama Prefecture
 Okayama Prefectural Board of Education
 host municipalities
 host municipalities’ boards of education
 The Okayama Executive Committee for the 25th National Cultural Festival
 The Municipal Executive Committee for the 25th National Cultural Festival

Cast 
 Shin Koyamada (as Makibi in Opening Ceremony)
 Chika Kano

Mascot character 
 Momocchi

See also 
 National Cultural Festival
 Ministry of Education, Culture, Sports, Science and Technology (Japan)
 Agency for Cultural Affairs

References

External links
Official website (Japanese)
Okayama Prefecture Official website
Okayama City Official website
Official site on Youtube
Official site on Facebook
Official site on Mixi (Japanese)

Cultural festivals in Japan
2010 festivals